Willy Ørskov (21 December 1920 in Aarhus – 12 June 1990 in Helsingør) was a Danish sculptor who is remembered for works created from plastics and inflatable materials.

Biography
Ørskov's studies at the Valand School of Fine Arts in Gothenburg, Sweden (1954–1960) were completed by stays in Paris, Greece and Italy at the end of the 1950s. During his years in Gothenburg, he taught and worked with ceramics. His early works such as Bymiljø and Gående are Abstract works depicting man in the city. He later began to use plastics including finished products such as pipes and funnels. His pneumatic sculptures consist of inflated pillow shapes and air-filled tubes as can be seen in Sommerskulptur (Summer Sculpture) from the mid-1960s.

Ørskov's works are not designed to be interpreted in terms of recognizable features but rather as an expression of contemporary art, free of any relationship with romantic notions of Naturalism or Mythology. One of his well-known dictums was "The sculpture's content is sculpture." He explained his approach in books such as Aflæsninger af objekter og andre essays (Readings of objects and other essays, 1972) and Den åbne skulptur og udvendighedens æstetik (Open Sculpture and the Aesthetics of the Exterior, 1987). Later in life, he became preoccupied with Terrains Vagues, the largely unorganized, underdeveloped areas on the outskirts of built-up areas, typically with casual, temporary living quarters where he found traces of a primitive sculptural language.

Restoration of works
The Danish National Gallery is currently undertaking the restoration of 13 of Ørskov's inflated works which are considered to be of outstanding national importance. Made of materials such as plastics and rubber, the sculptures have deteriorated to a point where they are no longer inflatable. After restoration and re-establishment of their pneumatic properties, the works will once again be suitable for display.

Awards
Ørskov was awarded the Eckersberg Medal in 1969  and the Thorvaldsen Medal in 1973.

References

Bibliography
Edwards, Folke: Willy Ørskov, 1976, Copenhagen, Gyldendal, . 
Grathwol, Grethe; Bojesen, Benedicte: Willy Ørskov retrospektiv, 1994, Copenhagen, Sophienholm. 
Ørskov, Willy: Aflæsning af objekter og andre essays, 1966, Copenhagen, Borgen. 
Ørskov, Willy: Den öppna skulpturen = avion veistotaide = den åbne skulptur, 1987, Helsinki, Nordiskt konstcentrum. 
Ørskov, Willy:
Ørskov, Willy: Lighed og identitet, 1978, Copenhagen, Borgen. . 
Ørskov, Willy: Objekterne - proces og tilstand, 1972, Copenhagen, Borgen. 

Danish sculptors
Danish male artists
1920 births
People from Aarhus
Recipients of the Eckersberg Medal
1990 deaths
Recipients of the Thorvaldsen Medal
20th-century sculptors
Male sculptors
Danish expatriates in Sweden